The Brabham BT18 was an open-wheel formula racing, designed, developed, and built by British constructor Brabham, for both Formula 2 and Formula 3 racing categories. Powered by a Honda engine, it won 11 out of 12 races in 1966.

Design and development
The previous Brabham BT16 forerunner initially had a Cosworth SCA, BRM, or Holbay MAE engine. On 20 March 1965, at the Formula Two meeting at Silverstone, it was equipped with the Honda RA300E engine. Displacing , the engine produced 135 bhp at 10,000 rpm.

The BT18 was designed as a Formula 2 and Formula 3 racing car. The car had a space frame that was reinforced by load-bearing plates. Two cars, F2-18-66 and F2-19-66, were used by the factory Brabham team with revised Honda RA302E engines, which now gave 150 bhp at 11,000 rpm. 32 were Formula 2 racing cars and designated BT18A. Six copies were equipped with a Cosworth SCA engine for private teams. A special version BT18B of 8 examples was fitted for the Honda Racing School with Ford Kent engines for the upcoming 1966 Formula Ford. A total of 46 examples of the BT18 (+A+B) were produced.

Race history
In 1966, Jack Brabham and Denny Hulme achieved a total of 11 wins in 12 races with the Brabham-Honda BT18. Brabham won the 1966 Trophées de France championship and Hulme was runner-up.

References

Brabham racing cars
Formula Two cars
Formula Three cars
1960s cars